Mark Stein (born 1951) is an American writer.

Early life and education 
Raised in Silver Spring, Maryland, he graduated from the University of Wisconsin–Madison in 1973.

Career 
Stein wrote the screenplay for the Goldie Hawn and Steve Martin film Housesitter. His stage plays were first produced at New Playwrights Theater of Washington, D.C.  From there he went on to productions at Actors Theater of Louisville, Manhattan Theatre Club, South Coast Repertory, the Oregon Shakespeare Festival, the Fountain Theater in Los Angeles, the Royal Manitoba Theatre Centre, and elsewhere.

His non-fiction book, How the States Got Their Shapes, became the basis for a History Channel series by the same name.

Works
Published plays
 The Groves of Academe and The Plumber's Apprentice (New York: Dramatists Play Service), 1983
 At Long Last Leo (New York: Dramatists Play Service), 1987
 Ghost Dance (New York: Playscripts Ltd., 2003)
 Direct from Death Row the Scottsboro Boys, (New York: Dramatists Play Service), 2006

Film and television 
 A Quiet Little Neighborhood, A Perfect Little Murder, NBC Movie of the Week, (dir. Anson Williams; starring Teri Garr, Robert Urich), October 14, 1990
 Housesitter, Imagine Films/Universal Studios, (dir. Frank Oz; starring Steve Martin, Goldie Hawn), 1992
 Chance of a Lifetime, CBS Movie of the Week, (dir. Deborah Reinish; starring John Ritter, Jean Stapleton), March 29, 1998
 Help Wanted, Male, Episode of Nero Wolfe (dir. Timothy Hutton; starring Timothy Hutton, Maury Chakin, Bill Smitrovich, Larry Drake), 2002

Non-fiction
 How the States Got Their Shapes (New York: Smithsonian/HarperCollins, 2008) , 
 How the States Got Their Shapes Too: The People Behind the Borderlines (Washington, D.C.: Smithsonian Books, 2011) 
 American Panic: A History of Who Scares Us and Why (New York: Palgrave Macmillan, 2014) , 
 Vice Capades : Sex, Drugs, and Bowling from the Pilgrims to the Present, Lincoln: Potomac Books, 2017, 
 The Presidential Fringe : Questing & Jesting for the Oval Office, Lincoln: Potomac Books, 2020,

References

 Stein, Mark, Internet Movie Database (IMDb) https://www.imdb.com/name/nm0825559/
 Stein, Mark, Doollee.com playwright database  http://www.doollee.com/PlaywrightsS/stein-mark.html
 Stein, Mark, Library of Congress catalog  http://catalog.loc.gov/cgi-bin/Pwebrecon.cgi?hd=1,4&Search_Arg=stein%2C%20mark&Search_Code=NAME%40&CNT=100&type=quick&PID=eDtVG6VdcPYnZAsXaJUtmg4Sp16&HIST=0&SEQ=20131201095521&SID=1
 Stein, Mark, homepage  http://www.marksteinauthor.com/index.htm

1951 births
Living people
People from Silver Spring, Maryland
University of Wisconsin–Madison alumni
20th-century American dramatists and playwrights
American male screenwriters
American male dramatists and playwrights
20th-century American male writers
20th-century American non-fiction writers
American male non-fiction writers
Screenwriters from Maryland